Whiplash is the name of multiple supervillains appearing in American comic books published by Marvel Comics. They are commonly depicted as members of Iron Man's rogues gallery. The original Whiplash (Mark Scarlotti) also went by the name Blacklash. Mickey Rourke portrayed Whiplash (Ivan Vanko) in the Marvel Cinematic Universe film Iron Man 2 (2010).

Publication history
Mark Scarlotti first appeared as Whiplash in Tales of Suspense #97 (Jan. 1968). He was killed in battle in Iron Man vol. 4 #28 (May 2000).

Leeann Foreman debuted as Whiplash in Marvel Comics Presents #49 (May 1990).

During the Civil War storyline, two new villains called Whiplash and Blacklash appear in Thunderbolts #104 (Sept. 2006) and #107 (Dec. 2006).

Another female Whiplash appeared in Big Hero 6 #1 (Nov. 2008).

Anton Vanko first appeared in Iron Man vs. Whiplash #1–4 (Jan.–April 2010). He later appeared as a member of the Masters of Evil.

Fictional character biography

Mark Scarlotti

Mark Scarlotti is originally a gifted electrical technician at Stark International's Cincinnati branch, but desires a life of luxury and becomes a professional criminal. With a costume and a sophisticated metal whip of his own design, the character becomes Whiplash, a weapons designer, special agent, and assassin for the criminal organization the Maggia. On behalf of the Maggia, Whiplash fights the hero Iron Man – secretly inventor Tony Stark and Scarlotti's former employer – and A.I.M. agents attacking a Maggia gambling ship.

Scarlotti is assigned to work undercover for the Maggia at Stark International's Cincinnati plant, and becomes Head of Research. As Whiplash, Scarlotti then has another inconclusive battle with Iron Man and flees the scene, quitting the Maggia. Whiplash, together with fellow supervillains the Melter and Man-Bull, are recruited by other-dimensional villain the Black Lama to form the team the Death Squad and fight Iron Man. They enter a "War of the Super-Villains" to win the Black Lama's Golden Globe of Power, but are all defeated.

Whiplash rejoins the Maggia and battles the heroes Spider-Man and Iron Man in New Jersey, eventually being defeated by the vigilante the Wraith. Criminal mastermind Justin Hammer hires Whiplash, and with the Melter and the original Blizzard attempt the robbery of an Atlantic City casino, but are stopped by Iron Man. Whiplash is released from prison by Hammer and battles Iron Man again as one of Hammer's costumed operatives, and despite overwhelming odds the hero defeats the villains.

Scarlotti is re-employed by an unnamed consortium, financed by Hammer, to kill Stark employee Vic Martinelli, and is provided with an upgraded costume and weaponry and the new alias Blacklash. Despite the upgrades, however, Scarlotti is defeated by Iron Man and humiliated by being dragged before his employers. Scarlotti makes a brief appearance as Whiplash as a paid employee of the master villain the Mad Thinker in a failed attempt to kill the hero the Thing who is recuperating at a New York hospital.

Scarlotti is eventually diagnosed as manic-depressive by prison psychiatrists. He attempts to reform, but rejected by his parents and residents of his home town, Scarlotti becomes Blacklash again. While attempting an assassination for the Maggia, Blacklash is confronted by Spider-Man whom he weakens with his whip, but is defeated by the second Iron Man. Blacklash is beaten by Spider-Man once again and is also apprehended by Captain America while committing several robberies. Blacklash is rehired by Justin Hammer and sent with the Beetle and the second Blizzard to assassinate Hammer's former agent Force. Iron Man, Jim Rhodes and Force, however, defeat the trio.

At Hammer's request Blacklash, Boomerang, and the second Blizzard stop industrial sabotage by the vigilante the Ghost. Blacklash is sent to work with Iron Man and Jim Rhodes against the saboteur, but betrays them. Together with Spider-Man villain the Rhino,  Blacklash hunts down fellow rogue agent the Scorpion, who fails to return stolen weaponry to Hammer.

Scarlotti decides to renounce his criminal identity and marries and has a child. A lack of money forces Scarlotti to assume his identity again, and he becomes the target of an assassin, who kills his wife when she returns to their apartment. As Blacklash, Scarlotti then finds and kills the assassin, and vows to abandon the identity of Blacklash forever. Scarlotti, however, is hired by a rival of Stark and returns as Whiplash, with an upgraded costume and new weaponry. Whiplash manages to battle Iron Man to a standstill in their first encounter, but is killed several weeks later by Iron Man's new sentient armor, which crushes Scarlotti's throat against Tony Stark's wishes.

Leeann Foreman

The second Whiplash is Leeann Foreman, a professional criminal born in Wilmington, Delaware. She was a mutant with unrevealed abilities and used adamantium wires connected to her gloves as whips. She was part of Critical Mass's mutant Band of Baddies. The Baddies kidnapped a mutant girl and her father to coerce them to join their band. They forced the daughter to knock out Spider-Man and Wolverine, but they quickly recovered. The daughter then unleashed her powers, blew up the warehouse they were in, and defeated all of the Baddies. Whiplash disappeared after the daughter's telekinetic explosion enabled her to get free.

She later joined the Femme Fatales, and was hired by the Chameleon to lure Spider-Man into a trap by threatening a United Nations ambassador. Spider-Man defeated the Femme Fatales and saved the ambassador. The Fatales then joined forces with the Scorpion and the Tarantula, but all of them were defeated by Spider-Man and the Black Cat. The Femme Fatales later received an invitation to join Superia and her organization of female criminals, the Femizons. They accepted, and were among the superhuman females aboard Superia's cruise ship, where they battled Captain America and the Paladin. Whiplash also traveled to Superia's private island to be one of her new Femizons.

After the group disbanded, Whiplash teamed up with Orka, Shockwave and Killer Shrike in a plot to take over a retired aircraft carrier, the USS Intrepid. She and her allies were defeated by Heroes for Hire. She was later seen in "Bar With No Name" and in a black market auction for the Venom Symbiote.

During the "Hunt for Wolverine" storyline, Whiplash took the name of Snake Whip and is with the Femme Fatales when they assist Viper in attacking Kitty Pryde's group at the King's Impresario Restaurant in Madripoor. She engaged Jubilee in battle before Kitty Pryde gets her and Domino away from the restaurant. Following that victory, Snake Whip stayed by Viper's side as she ordered Knockout and Mindblast to have a defeated Rogue and Storm be delivered to their clients and when Viper speaks to a representative from Soteira. As Snake Whip asks if they are going to ignore Sapphire Styx's vampiric appetite, Viper says that they have to obey the representative's orders and "let the @#$%& feed." After another call from Soteira's representative, Viper and Snake Whip check up on Sapphire and find her acting strange claiming that Wolverine's Patch alias is here. Snake Whip works to restrain her only to get knocked out. Upon recovering, Snake Whip starts to see Patch attacking Sapphire even though Viper doesn't see it. After Sapphire Styx exploded enabling Psylocke to use her soul power to recreate a new body, Psylocke used her powers to defeat Bloodlust and use an illusion to trick Snake Whip into hitting the ground. Domino persuaded Snake Whip to surrender when her teammates are defeated. When the Femme Fatales were arrested, Kitty Pryde got the info about Soteira being after Wolverine from Snake Whip who gave the information to her in exchange for a light sentence.

Whiplash and Blacklash duo
Two villains, a woman who is the third Whiplash and a man who is the second Blacklash, appear during the outset of the Superhuman Civil War. Both are past associates of the Swordsman (Andreas von Strucker) and frequenters of BDSM events before becoming supervillains. The duo are forcibly recruited into the Thunderbolts.

Construct
This version of Whiplash is not a person, but a personality construct created by the aptly named Badgal. The construct is feminine and thus tends to possess females. Initially, Badgal used this construct to possess a random citizen, but later used it to possess Honey Lemon and later GoGo Tomago. When the Big Hero 6 defeated Badgal, this construct ceased to exist.

Anton Vanko

Anton Vanko is a young scientist from a small Russian village by the name of Volstok who has no relation to the original Crimson Dynamo. One day, the village is attacked by someone wearing a stolen suit of Iron Man armor, who murders a number of townspeople, including his father Igor Vanko in an attempt to frame Tony Stark.

Using a specialized rifle, Vanko is able to shoot the impostor just before he flees, causing the chest plate on the armor to come off. Vanko becomes obsessed with exacting vengeance on Stark, still believing him to be the man who attacked his village, and decides to use the chest plate to fashion a suitable weapon to do so. Over the next six months, he reverse engineers a suit of body armor equipped with energy whips, and vows to kill Stark to avenge his father.

After breaking into the prison where Stark is being held for his alleged crimes, Vanko kills several guards and attempts to track down and murder Stark and his confidant Pepper Potts. Stark fights off Vanko using a crude suit of Iron Man armor fashioned from parts of various machines around the prison, and forces him to flee. After Stark tracks down the criminal syndicate who framed him, Vanko arrives at their headquarters, intent on finishing off Iron Man once and for all. It is there that Vanko learns that Stark was indeed framed and that the syndicate was hired to destroy Volstok by secret international consortium funded by several governments including USA and Russia, notably Russian Prime Minister Vladimir Putin, to wipe out an activist who was creating anti-Putin sentiments. Despite learning of Iron Man's innocence, Vanko makes one final attempt to kill him, claiming that even though he did not destroy the village, his technology did. After the building catches fire, both men are ultimately forced to run to safety, and Vanko then makes his escape. Following this, Stark is cleared of his alleged crimes, and helps rebuild Volstok. As this is happening, Vanko is seen in Moscow approaching Saint Basil's Cathedral in the Red Square preparing to properly exact vengeance this time around.

Whiplash is later recruited by Max Fury as a member of the Shadow Council's incarnation of the Masters of Evil.

During the Infinity storyline, Whiplash is among the villains recruited by Spymaster to help him in a plot to attack the almost-defenseless Stark Tower.

He later attacks Squirrel Girl and her sidekick Tippy-Toe when he mistakes her for Iron Man, since she was wearing one of his armors, but is later defeated.

Whiplash later appears as a member of Baron Helmut Zemo's third incarnation of the Masters of Evil.

During the "Devil's Reign" storyline, Taskmaster appears as a member of Mayor Wilson Fisk's latest incarnation of the Thunderbolts at the time when Mayor Fisk passed a law that forbids superhero activity. He and Whiplash hold the staff of the Daily Bugle hostage to draw out Spider-Man. During Spider-Man's fight with Taskmaster, Whiplash is goaded into attacking him. Despite being weakened by Whiplash, Spider-Man tries to ask Taskmaster if they can take it outside as Taskmaster places a power dampener collar on him and throws him out the window. Spider-Man uses his webbing to slow his descent to the ground as the NYPD operatives move in on him.

Female Blacklash
As part of the "All-New, All-Different Marvel," a female supervillain takes the name of Blacklash. The female Blacklash was hired by Power Broker through the Hench App to protect his unveiling of Hench App 2.0. She ended up fighting Ant-Man and Giant-Man (Raz Malhotra) when they show up to confront Power Broker. The battle ends with Blacklash escaping due to Giant-Man's crimefighting inexperience.

Powers and abilities
Mark Scarlotti, courtesy of Justin Hammer, wears a bulletproof costume and wields a pair of cybernetically controlled titanium whips that can extend to be swung fast enough to deflect bullets, or become rigid and be used as nunchaku or vaulting-poles. He also carries a variety of devices in a weapons pouch, including anti-gravity bolas and a necro-lash which releases electrical energy generated by his gauntlets. Scarlotti is a research engineer and weapons design specialist, with a college degree in engineering.

Leeann Foreman wears two gauntlets containing three spring-loaded retractable omnium steel whip-like cables on each of her arms. Each cable can extend a maximum length of about 25 feet and contains needle-sharp adamantium barbs on the tips. She wears a padded costume of synthetic stretch fabric laced with kevlar, leather shoulder padding, and steel breastplates and mask, which provides her some protection from physical damage.

The unnamed Whiplash and Blacklash have no apparent superhuman abilities, relying on advanced energized whips.

Anton Vanko possesses a suit of armor equipped with two energy whips built into the wrists. The whips are shown to be powerful enough to slash through a metal staircase, as well as deflect a barrage of gunfire. He is also a skilled athlete and possesses a deep understanding of robotics, enough that he was able to fashion his suit from a destroyed piece of Stark technology.

Other versions

Ultimate Marvel
Orson Scott Card's Ultimate Iron Man features an alternate universe version named Marc Scott, a Texan businessman competing with Tony Stark for military contracts via his company Whiplash.

The Ultimate Marvel version of Whiplash appears in the 150th issue of Ultimate Spider-Man. He is among a crowd as at Tony Stark's donation party outside the New York Hall of Science, when he attacks him only to be stopped by Spider-Man. He is seen wielding two electrical whips powered by some kind of battery. When asked by Stark why he is attacking him, Whiplash believes he is on a "mission from God to kill Tony Stark". It is revealed that he indeed is a Russian terrorist named Anton Vanko.

A new, female version of Whiplash later appears as part of a team of mercenaries known as the Femme Fatales.

In other media

Television
 Mark Scarlotti / Blacklash appears in Iron Man (1994), voiced initially by James Avery and later by Dorian Harewood. This version is a servant of the Mandarin who competes with Dreadknight for Hypnotia's attention.
 Whiplash appears in Iron Man: Armored Adventures, voiced by Peter Kelamis. This version is a robotic assassin who works for inventor/arms dealer Mr. Fix in season one and Justin Hammer in season two until the latter uses his Titanium Man armor to destroy him off-screen, believing Whiplash was blackmailing him.
 The unnamed female incarnation of Whiplash makes a cameo appearance in The Avengers: Earth's Mightiest Heroes episode "Breakout, Part 1". She is initially an inmate at the Vault before it loses power, allowing her and the other inmates to escape.
 The Anton Vanko incarnation of Whiplash appears in Phineas and Ferb: Mission Marvel, voiced by Peter Stormare.
 The Anton Vanko incarnation of Whiplash appears in the Avengers Assemble episode "The Conqueror", voiced by Troy Baker. This version is an associate of A.I.M. who uses whips that incorporate Kang the Conqueror's futuristic technology.

Marvel Cinematic Universe

Several individuals based on the various comics incarnations of Whiplash appear in media set in the Marvel Cinematic Universe (MCU).
 Ivan Antonovich Vanko, an original character based on the Anton Vanko incarnation of Whiplash and the Crimson Dynamo, appears in the film Iron Man 2, portrayed by Mickey Rourke. A ruthless and physically strong technological genius bent on ruining Tony Stark as revenge for the latter's father Howard Stark discrediting his own father, Anton, Ivan builds an Arc Reactor to power a pair of electrified metal whips and manipulates Justin Hammer into providing him with additional weaponry in exchange for manufacturing Hammer Drones. Ivan has two confrontations with Stark, the first time while wearing a harness for his whips and the second with full body armor supplied by Hammer. Ivan is defeated by Iron Man and War Machine during the second encounter and tries unsuccessfully to use the drones and his armor's self-destruct to take them with him.
 Anton Vanko (portrayed by Evgeniy Lazarev) also appears in Iron Man 2 as a scientist who worked with Howard to invent the Arc Reactor in the 1960s, only to be deported back to the Soviet Union and sent to the Gulag after being caught selling stolen patents on the black market. His death in the present sparks Ivan's quest for vengeance. Additionally, a younger version of Anton appears in the television series Agent Carter, portrayed by Costa Ronin.
 Mark Scarlotti, renamed Marcus Scarlotti, appears in the Agents of S.H.I.E.L.D. television series episode "A Fractured House", portrayed by Falk Hentschel. This version is a Hydra-aligned mercenary who wields a whip-like weapon in battle.

Video games
 The Mark Scarlotti incarnation of Whiplash appears as a boss in Iron Man (2008), voiced by Zach McGowan. This version possesses rigid energy-charged whips and can generate a shield.
 The Anton Vanko incarnation of Whiplash appears as a boss in Marvel: Avengers Alliance.
 The Anton Vanko incarnation of Whiplash appears in Lego Marvel Super Heroes, voiced by John DiMaggio.
 The MCU incarnation of Ivan Vanko / Whiplash appears as a playable character in Marvel: Future Fight.

Toys
 The MCU incarnation of Ivan Vanko / Whiplash and the Anton Vanko incarnation of Whiplash received figures in Hasbro's Iron Man 2 tie-in line.
 The MCU incarnation of Ivan Vanko / Whiplash received a figure in Marvel Super Hero Squad line's "Final Battle" three-pack alongside figures of Iron Man and a Hammer Drone.
 The MCU incarnation of Ivan Vanko / Whiplash received a figure in the Marvel Minimates line. Additionally, a battle damaged version was released as a Borders-exclusive.
 The MCU incarnation of Ivan Vanko / Whiplash received a figure from Hot Toys.
 Whiplash received a figure in a Mega Bloks blind pack.

References

External links
 
 
 
 
 
 

Fictional mercenaries in comics
Fictional murderers
Marvel Comics male supervillains

Characters created by Gene Colan
Characters created by Stan Lee
Comics characters introduced in 1968
Fictional characters from Cincinnati
Fictional engineers
Fictional gangsters
Fictional Italian American people
Fictional whip users

Characters created by Erik Larsen
Comics characters introduced in 1990
Fictional characters from Delaware
Marvel Comics female supervillains
Marvel Comics mutants

Action film villains
Characters created by Marc Guggenheim
Comics characters introduced in 2010
Fictional Russian people
Iron Man characters
Male characters in film
Marvel Comics scientists